Powerhouse is a 1977 compilation album by Deep Purple, featuring previously unreleased live and studio tracks from the band's Mark II line-up at the height of its powers. The album achieved Gold Certification in Japan.

Track listing
All songs written by Ritchie Blackmore, Ian Gillan, Roger Glover, Jon Lord and Ian Paice, except where indicated.

Side one
 "Painted Horse" – 5:19 (outtake from the Who Do We Think We Are sessions in July 1972)
 "Hush" (Joe South) – 4:37 (live from the Concerto for Group and Orchestra program in September 1969)
 "Wring That Neck" (Blackmore, Lord, Paice, Nick Simper) – 12:51 (live from the Concerto for Group and Orchestra program in September 1969)

Side two
"Child in Time" – live – 12:29 (live from the Concerto for Group and Orchestra program in September 1969)
 "Black Night" – 4:59 (live single B-side from the Made in Japan dates in August 1972)
 "Cry Free" – 3:11 (outtake from the Deep Purple in Rock sessions in January 1970)

Personnel
Deep Purple
 Ian Gillan – vocals, harmonica
 Ritchie Blackmore – guitars
 Jon Lord – keyboards
 Roger Glover – bass
 Ian Paice – drums, percussion

Charts

Certifications

References

1977 compilation albums
Deep Purple compilation albums
EMI Records compilation albums